The 2020–21 season is Greenock Morton's sixth consecutive season in the Scottish Championship, following their promotion from Scottish League One in the 2014–15 season. They will also compete in the Scottish Cup and Scottish League Cup.

Season summary
In June 2020, eight of the ten clubs voted in favour of shortening the season from the usual 36 games to 27 (playing each other three times), with the season tentatively scheduled to start on 16 October 2020. This was done to reduce costs in light of the coronavirus pandemic.

Competitions

Scottish Championship

Matches

Scottish Championship Play–off

Matches

League table

Scottish League Cup

Group stage

Scottish Cup

Notes

References

Greenock Morton
Greenock Morton F.C. seasons